The 1983 British National Track Championships were a series of track cycling competitions held from 30 July – 7 August 1983 at the Leicester Velodrome.

Medal summary

Men's Events

Women's Events

References

1983 in British sport
July 1983 sports events in the United Kingdom
August 1983 sports events in the United Kingdom